Dietrich I was the last count of Isenberg and Altena, the first count of Limburg (Limburg a.d. Lenne) (before 1215 – 1301), son of Friedrich II of Isenberg, count of Isenberg and Altena.

 
Dietrich I was disinherited of all his territories in the First Reich (German Realm) of the Holy Roman Empire following the execution of his father, but with the military support of his uncle the Duke of Limburg (Vesdre), recovered a small territory out of his previous possessions. He built the castles of Limburg (Hohenlimburg) and Neu Isenberg (soon lost in favour of the counts von der Mark) and took the title of count of Limburg "comes de Ysenberghe et de  Limborch". 

He married Aleidis (Adelheid), countess of Sayn, a daughter of Johann I von Spanheim and Adelheid von Altena. They had issue:

 Heinrich of Limburg (living 1240-1246);
 Johann ancestor of the Lords of Limburg-Styrum (born before 1246, died before 1277). He married Agnes von Wildenberg; 
 Elisabeth countess of Limburg (born before 1253, died 1311). She married Heinrich von Wildenburg, son of Gerhard II von Wildenburg;
 Sophie countess of Limburg-Isenberg (born before 1253), married to Bertold VI von Buren, Marschall of Westfalia (born before 1284, died after 1320), a son of Bertold IV von Buren and Dedel von Arnsberg;
 Adelheid (born before 1253, died after 1266). She married Albert II Ritter von Hoerde (born before 1226, died after 1266);
 Everhard I, ancestor  of Counts of Limburg-Hohenlimburg and Broich (born before 1271,  died after 1304. 1308 He married Agnes N.(probable of Volmarsteyn)

Literature
 Hoederath, H.T. Der Fall des Hauses Isenberg 1225/1226 . In rechtsgeschichterlicher und soziologischer Schau, 1954 Zeitschrift der Savigny stiftung fur Rechtsgeschichte. Kanonistische Abteilung
 Aders,G. Die Grafen (von Limburg) und die Herrn von Limburg-Styrum aus dem Haus Berg-Altena-Isenberg. Zeitschift 'Der Marker" 1956 blad 7.
 Berg, A. Lineage counts of Limburg Hohenlimburg and Linage Lords of Limburg-Styrum. Archive fur Sippenforschung Heft 14. Jahrgang 30. Mai 1964.
 Korteweg, K.N. Dietrich I Graf von Limburg Hohenlimburg. His two descendant lines Lords of Limburg Styrum and counts of Limburg Hohenlimburg. De Nederlandse Leeuw Jaargang LXXXI no.8 August 1964. 
 Eversberg, H. Graf Friederich von Isenberg und die Isenburg 1193-1226. Hattingen 1989
 Bleicher, W. Hohenlimburgher Heimatblätter fűr den Raum Hagen und Isenlohn. Beiträge zur Landeskunde. Monatsschrift des Vereins fűr Orts- und Heimatkunde Hohenlimburg e.V. Drűck Geldsetzer und Schäfer Gmbh. Iserlohn. County of Limburg Lenne. 1976-2012

References 
 Berg, A. 1964.[German] Archive fur Sippenforschung Heft 14. Jahrgang 30. Mai 1964.
 Bleicher, W. / Van Limburg H, 1998-2004  [German / Dutch] Neue Aspekte der Geschichte der Grafen von Hohen-Limburg und ihrer Nachkommen. In: Hohenlimburger Heimatblätter  
 Limburg van,H. [German] Graven van Limburg Hohenlimburg & Broich. 2010 Charter and Deed transcriptions. 1180-1800. Two Volumes: DL01&DL02. 
 Korteweg, K.N. 1964 [Dutch] De Nederlandse Leeuw Jrg. LXXXI 1964 fol. 266-276.

Sources 

Counts of Limburg
Counts of Germany
13th-century births
1301 deaths
House of Berg

House of Limburg-Stirum